Megachile auriculata is a species of bee in the family Megachilidae. It was described by Gupta in 1989.

References

Auriculata
Insects described in 1989